Jason Lewis (born c. 1970/1971) is an American actor and former fashion model. He is known for his role as Jerry "Smith" Jerrod on the HBO series Sex and the City.

Early life
Lewis was born in Newport Beach, California, to Nancy, a nurse, and Gregory Lewis, a judge; his parents are divorced. He has three siblings, Sean, Katie and Nicole. He grew up in Los Alamitos, California, and graduated from Los Alamitos High School. He attended college at San Diego State University. After college he started modeling, first in Paris and then with star status in Milan in the late 1990s for Guess?, Tommy Hilfiger and Hugo Boss, among others.

Career
In 1995, Lewis made his acting debut as a regular on High Sierra Search and Rescue. He appeared on Beverly Hills, 90210 in 1997, playing Rob Andrews, a love interest of character Valerie (Tiffani-Amber Thiessen). His most prominent role to date was on Sex and the City, where he was a recurring member of the show's cast in its final season as waiter turned emerging young actor Jerry "Smith" Jerrod, the one man whose sincerity got to Samantha. He reprised the role in 2008's Sex and the City: The Movie and its 2010 sequel.

Lewis has appeared in several films: My Bollywood Bride, a Hollywood/Bollywood romantic comedy where Lewis plays the leading man opposite Bollywood actress Kashmera Shah, and Mr. Brooks, a thriller, where he plays opposite Demi Moore and Kevin Costner. He is also known in Europe for playing the hunk on the Aero Advert for Aero Bubbles.

After appearing on The WB's supernatural drama Charmed, where he played the recurring role of Dex Lawson, a love interest (and brief husband) of Phoebe Halliwell (Alyssa Milano), it was announced on December 5, 2006, that he would guest-star on episodes of Brothers & Sisters as a possible love interest to Matthew Rhys' character Kevin Walker. He signed on to do seven episodes to play Chad Barry, a closeted gay soap opera actor who finds it difficult trying to develop a relationship with Kevin while keeping his sexuality secret from the Hollywood press. He reprised the role in an episode in April 2009. He also played a soap opera actor on two episodes of House. Lewis appears and is highlighted on the cover in the limited-edition coffee table book About Face, shot by celebrity photographer John Russo and published by Pixie Press Worldwide.

Lewis is a supporter of the LGBT community. On May 10, 2008, he attended the 19th GLAAD Media Awards, a ceremony that celebrates gay-friendly actors and actresses as well as media outlets.

Lewis appeared in the How I Met Your Mother episode "The Wedding Bride" as a star in a fictional film within the show. He starred in the 2011 Canadian film Textuality. In addition, he appeared as Pete in the Israeli television show, Be With Her. He starred as Christopher Dollanganger in If There Be Thorns and Seeds of Yesterday, the third and fourth films of the Flowers in the Attic TV film series based on the Dollanganger novel series by V.C. Andrews.

On September 8, 2022, Lewis was announced as a contestant on season 31 of Dancing with the Stars. He was partnered with Peta Murgatroyd. They were eliminated during week 1, finishing in last place.

Personal life 
On 14 February 2020, Lewis announced his engagement to producer Liz Godwin.

Filmography

Films

Television

References

External links
 
 Men's Fitness interview

1970s births
20th-century American male actors
21st-century American male actors
Male actors from Newport Beach, California
American male film actors
Male models from California
American male television actors
American LGBT rights activists
Living people
People from Greater Los Angeles
Activists from California